The A.F. Cappelli Block is a historic mixed-use commercial and residential building at 263 Atwells Avenue, facing DePasquale Plaza in the Federal Hill neighborhood of Providence, Rhode Island.  It is a four-story brick structure, with two storefronts on the ground floor, and residential units on the upper floors.  It is faced in red brick, with tan bricks at the corners giving it a quoined appearance.  The store fronts feature original cast iron finishes.  It was built in 1909 by Antonio Cappelli, and was (then as now) one of the tallest buildings in the Federal Hill area.

The block was listed on the National Register of Historic Places in 1980.

See also
National Register of Historic Places listings in Providence, Rhode Island

References

Commercial buildings on the National Register of Historic Places in Rhode Island
Buildings and structures in Providence, Rhode Island
National Register of Historic Places in Providence, Rhode Island
Buildings and structures completed in 1909